Between 1935 and 1955, American singer Ella Fitzgerald was signed to Decca Records. Her early recordings as a featured vocalist were frequently uncredited. Her first credited single was 78 RPM recording "I'll Chase the Blues Away" with the Chick Webb Orchestra. Fitzgerald continued recording with Webb until his death in 1939, after which the group was renamed Ella Fitzgerald and Her Famous Orchestra. With the introduction of 10" and 12" Long-Playing records in the late 1940s, Decca released several original albums of Fitzgerald's music and reissued many of her previous single-only releases. From 1935 to the late 1940s Decca issued Ella Fitzgerald's recordings on 78rpm singles and album collections, in book form, of four singles that included eight tracks. These recordings have been re-issued on a series of 15 compact disc by the French record label Classics Records between 1992 and 2008.

In 1956 Ella Fitzgerald signed with Verve Records, the Norman Granz record label. Fitzgerald recorded with Verve until the mid-1960s. Included in this era were a series of eight Song Book albums, with interpretations of the greater part of the Great American Songbook, with songs from the pens of Cole Porter (1956), Rodgers & Hart (1956), Duke Ellington (1957), Irving Berlin (1958), George and Ira Gershwin (1959), Harold Arlen (1961), Jerome Kern (1963) and Johnny Mercer (1964). Ella Fitzgerald released many stand alone singles throughout her Verve years. These were re-issued in 2003 on the 2-CD set, Jukebox Ella: The Complete Verve Singles, Vol. 1.

The late 1960s and early 1970s saw Fitzgerald release albums on several major record labels, including three albums on Capitol Records and two on the Reprise Records label. In 1972 Norman Granz formed Pablo Records, the label continued to release Ella Fitzgerald's albums up until her last recorded album All That Jazz in 1989.

In recent years the Ella Fitzgerald back catalogue has continued to grow, this includes complete albums of previously unreleased live material and alternative recordings from her studio sessions.

Studio albums

1950s

1960s

1970s

1980s

Live albums 
The albums are sorted by release date.

Notable guest appearances 
The albums are sorted by release date.
 1956 – Metronome All-Stars 1956
1960 – The Drum Battle: Gene Krupa and Buddy Rich at J.A.T.P.
 1989 – Back on the Block
 1992 – Music From The Original Motion Picture Soundtrack THE SETTING SUN (Compact Disc RCA VICTOR VICP 8084, Japan. Ella Fitzgerald sings "The Setting Sun". It was her last professional recording, recorded at Warner Bros. Studios in January 1992 with arrangements by Billy May. Source:https://www.discogs.com/it/Various-The-Setting-Sun-Rakuy%C3%B4-Music-From-The-Original-Motion-Picture-Soundtrack/release/8310263)
 2002 – Classic Duets (Three duets with Frank Sinatra, originally recorded in 1957 on the ABC TV series The Frank Sinatra Show)

Boxed sets and collections 

 1994 – The Complete Ella Fitzgerald Song Books
 1995 – Ella: The Legendary Decca Recordings
 1997 – The Complete Ella Fitzgerald & Louis Armstrong on Verve
 1998 – Swingsation: Ella Fitzgerald with Chick Webb
 1998 – Ella 100
 2017 - Ella Fitzgerald: 100 Songs for a Centennial

Hit singles

References 

Discography
Vocal jazz discographies
Discographies of American artists